Valeri Yevseevich Kozinets ( May 9, 1939 - November 8, 2020) is a Soviet Russian stage and film actor and screenwriter.

Biography 
In the 1960s, Kozinets was an actor at the Moscow Yermolova Theatre. From 1971 to 1977, he was an actor at Mosfilm. In 1977, he joined Lenfilm.

In 1972, he starred in the main role of Ruslan in the film adaptation of the poem by A. Pushkin “Ruslan and Lyudmila”, directed by Alexander Ptushko.

Selected filmography

Actor 

1968 – Spartacus in Razbudite Mukhina 
 1972 – Ruslan in Ruslan and Ludmila
 1976 – Aleksey Antonov in 72 gradusa nizhe nulya
 1982 – A pirate in Treasure Island
 1991 – Savely in Get Thee Out

Screenwriter 

 2011 – We declare war on you (miniseries)

References

External links 
 https://www.imdb.com/name/nm0468878/bio
 https://www.kino-teatr.ru/kino/acter/m/sov/2039/bio/
 http://www.cultin.ru/actors-kozinec-valerijj-evseevich

Living people
1939 births
Soviet male film actors